Lawrence Marshall Grace (16 April 1854 – 10 January 1934) was a 19th-century Member of Parliament from the Bay of Plenty region of New Zealand.

He represented the Tauranga electorate from 1885 to 1887, when he retired.

He was the son of missionary Thomas Grace and Agnes Fearon. Lawrence's twin brother was John Edward. In 1885 he married Te Kahui Te Heuheu, daughter of Ngāti Tuwharetoa paramount chief Te Heuheu Tūkino IV, and sister of Tureiti Te Heuheu Tukino V. They had 12 children. Their eldest daughter, Bessie Te Wenerau Grace, was the first Māori woman to earn a degree from a university. His son, Hāmi Grace, was a New Zealand cricketer.

As an MP and son-in-law of Te Heuheu Tūkino IV, Grace was involved in the negotiations to establish Tongariro National Park.

References

1854 births
1934 deaths
Members of the New Zealand House of Representatives
New Zealand MPs for North Island electorates
19th-century New Zealand politicians